Liam Mandeville (born 17 February 1997) is an English professional footballer who plays as forward for Chesterfield.

Career
Mandeville made his first team debut for Doncaster Rovers on 3 April 2015, coming on as a second-half substitute for Jonson Clarke-Harris in a home League One match against Bradford City at the Keepmoat Stadium. In November 2015, he joined Northern Premier League Premier Division side Whitby Town on a one-month loan deal. Mandeville scored his first professional goal for Doncaster Rovers in a 2–1 defeat to Walsall at the Keepmoat Stadium.

Mandeville scored his first goal of the season in an EFL Cup game against Nottingham Forest which Rovers went onto lose 2–1. On 8 October 2016 Andy Williams was injured in a game v Barnet which gave Mandeville a chance in the first team. He started his goal scoring form with a goal against Oldham in the FA Cup which Rovers lost 2–1 again. Mandeville inspired Rovers to come from 1–0 behind to defeat Exeter 3–1. He got a goal and assist which led him to start against Hartlepool and he scored the winner in this game. He scored 2 more against Leyton Orient and another against Stevenage. Mandeville missed a late penalty against Plymouth in a 2–0 defeat. Plymouth's goalkeeper Luke McCormick  mocked him which led to captain James Coppinger being sent off in the aftermath. He then scored from a free kick to earn Doncaster a win against Grimsby Town. This capped off the week that Mandeville won the EFL young player of the month.

On 31 January 2018, he joined League Two club Colchester United on loan until the end of the 2017–18 season. He made his Colchester debut from the bench on 10 February in their 1–1 draw at Carlisle United.

He was released by Doncaster at the end of the 2018–19 season.

On 5 June 2019, Mandeville signed a two-year contract with Chesterfield.

Style of play
"He's got a lot of attributes that I want from an attacker; he's got good vision, he can finish with both feet and he's very good technically." Darren Ferguson on Mandeville in 2016.

Career statistics

References

External links

1997 births
Living people
People from Lincoln, England
English footballers
England semi-pro international footballers 
Doncaster Rovers F.C. players
Whitby Town F.C. players
Colchester United F.C. players
Morecambe F.C. players
Chesterfield F.C. players
Association football forwards
English Football League players
National League (English football) players
Northern Premier League players